Hushang [hʊ'ʃəŋ] or Hōshang (in ), Middle Persian 𐭤𐭥𐭱𐭭𐭢 Hōšang, was the second Shāh to rule the world according to Ferdowsi's Shāhnāmeh. Hushang is also named as the legendary figure Haošiiaŋha 𐬵𐬀𐬊𐬱𐬌𐬌𐬀𐬢𐬵𐬀 in the ancient Zoroastrian scripture of the Avesta. Hushang is also called Pishdād (پیشداد), older Pēšdād, corresponding to Avestan 𐬞𐬀𐬭𐬀𐬜𐬁𐬙𐬀 Paraδāta, "first created".

Etymology
Haošyaŋha is the Avestan development of Proto-Iranian *Haušyahah, containing the prefix *Hau-, a derived form of *Hu-, 'good, well', and an uncertain root šyah-, possibly to be interpreted as 'selecting' or 'deciding'. The name might then be interpreted as meaning 'of the good choice'.

Haošyaŋha in Zoroastrian literature 
Haošyaŋha's original status is uncertain.  He may have begun as a demon-defeating hero, or may have been a rival for the title of first man (or first king) with Gayōmart.  One trace that may remain of that status is the labelling of the entire early line of kings as the Pishdadian dynasty, after Hushang's name Pishdād.

The Reign of Hushang 
The just and prudent Hushang was now master of the world, and he set the crown on his head and ruled in his grandfather's place. He reigned for forty years, and his mind was filled with wisdom, his heart with justice. Sitting on the royal throne, he said, “From this throne I rule over the seven climes, and everywhere my commands are obeyed." Mindful of God's will, he set about establishing justice. he helped the world flourish, and filled the face of the earth with his just rule.

Hushang in the Shāhnāma

In the epic poem of the Shāhnāmeh, Hushang was the son of Siyāmak and grandson of Keyumars.  He led the army against the son of Ahriman and avenged the death of Siyāmak.  After the death of Keyumars, Hushang became king of the human race. During Hushang's reign, many new discoveries were made for the comfort of humanity.  Hushang discovered iron and the principles of iron-working; the methods of agriculture and irrigation; he learned how to domesticate certain beasts as livestock and for use as draught animals; how to make clothing from the furs of other beasts; and he discovered how to make fire from flint.   This happened when Hushang hurled a flint rock to kill a venomous black serpent.  Missing the serpent, the rock struck another flint to produce fiery sparks. Hushang learned how to make fire this way, and taught his people; in honor of the discovery, they established the Sadeh festival.  After a reign of forty years, he left the kingdom to his son Tahmuras.

References

External links
 A king's book of kings: the Shah-nameh of Shah Tahmasp, an exhibition catalog from The Metropolitan Museum of Art (fully available online as PDF), which contains material on Hushang
 

Mythological kings
Pishdadian dynasty